Macrolobium pittieri is a species of plant in the family Fabaceae. It is found in Colombia and Panama. It is threatened by habitat loss.

References

 

Detarioideae
Flora of Colombia
Flora of Panama
Endangered plants
Taxonomy articles created by Polbot